Housewife, 49 is a 2006 television film based on the wartime diaries of Nella Last. Written by and starring English actress and comedian Victoria Wood, it follows the experiences of an ordinary housewife and mother in the Northern English town of Barrow-in-Furness, Lancashire, during the Second World War. It was first broadcast in the UK by ITV on 10 December 2006.

Plot
The Mass-Observation project was set up in 1937  by Charles Madge, a poet and journalist and Tom Harrisson, an anthropologist to 'record the voice of ordinary people'. They recruited volunteer 'observers' to report to them and in 1939 invited people to send them an account of their lives. Nella Last was one of 500 people who took up this offer.

Her diaries sent weekly are headed  "Housewife, 49", her age when she first began the correspondence.<ref>Nella Last's War, p. ii.</ref> Her diaries sent to Mass-Observation, often written in pencil, provide the narrative of the play as it unfolds her life. Edited versions of her diary have been published:Nella Last's War edited by Richard Broad and Suzy Fleming appeared first in 1981 and has been more recently re-published by Profile Books in 2007. Housewife, 49 is based on this book which covers the years 1939 to 1945.Nella Last's Peace, which appeared in 2009, includes diary entries from her immediate post-war years. A third volume, Nella Last in the 1950s: Further diaries of Housewife, 49, which includes material not published in Nella Last's War, was published in 2010.

In some scenes, the staff of Mass-Observation are seen reacting to, and sometimes visibly moved by, her letters.  During the course of the programme, Last moves from being an introverted, isolated, and depressed individual in a difficult marriage, to become an outgoing character who, through her voluntary work during wartime, becomes a backbone of the local community. At the end of the programme it is explained that Nella continued to write to Mass-Observation until her death in 1968. The original diary, together with hundreds of other diaries and Mass-Observation's other papers, are now held within the Mass-Observation Archive, housed by the University of Sussex at The Keep, Brighton.

It also documents the lead character's changing relationships with those around her; standing up to her domineering husband (David Threlfall), developing a close but sometimes strained friendship with Mrs Waite (Stephanie Cole) the head of the Local Women's Voluntary Service, and her changing relationships with her eldest son Arthur (Ben Crompton), and her younger son Cliff (Christopher Harper) who is altered by his experiences of combat. It is also implied that Cliff, who in real life became a sculptor in Australia, was gay; although Nella either does not realise or refuses to acknowledge it.

Cast
 Victoria Wood as Nella Last, Housewife 49
 David Threlfall as 'Daddy', husband Will Last
 Christopher Harper as Cliff Last, youngest son
 Ben Crompton as Arthur Last, eldest son
 Lorraine Ashbourne as Dot, Nella's sister in law
 Sally Bankes  as Mrs Whittaker
 Stephanie Cole as Mrs Waite, head of the Local WVS

Reception
CriticalThe Guardian thought it revealed Victoria Wood "to be both a far better writer than we had ever guessed and a far better actor as well."

Awards
The film won two British Academy Television Awards in 2007: "Best Single Drama", and "Best Actress" for Victoria Wood for her portrayal of Nella Last.

Home mediaHousewife, 49 was released on DVD in the US on 11 March 2008.

In other media
Theatre
In September 2013, Victoria Wood chose the small Old Laundry theatre in Bowness-on-Windermere as the venue for the premiere of the stage version of Housewife 49.

Bibliography
 Nellie Last (2006). Nella Last's War: The Second World War Diaries of 'Housewife, 49'. Profile Books. .

External links
 
 Newspaper interview with Victoria Wood, Manchester Evening News'', 2010–04.
  Filming the railway sequences in Housewife, 49

References

2006 television films
2006 films
Films set in Cumbria
Films shot in England
ITV television dramas
Films with screenplays by Victoria Wood
World War II films based on actual events
Television series by ITV Studios
Television shows produced by Granada Television
British television films
Films directed by Gavin Millar
2000s English-language films